Stefano Falzagalloni (1480 - 1551) was an Italian painter, active in his Ferrara.

Corrado Ricci thought he imitated or passed off his works as those of his master, il Garofalo.

References

1480 births
1551 deaths
16th-century Italian painters
Italian male painters
Italian Renaissance painters
Painters from Ferrara